Jules Harder was the first chef of the Palace Hotel in San Francisco, California when it first opened in 1876. He had previously been chef at Delmonico's and the Union Club in New York City, and the Grand Union Hotel in Saratoga.  In 1885 he authored The Physiology of Taste: Harder’s Book of Practical American Cookery, the first (and only) of a planned six-volume book on cooking.

References 
An American Feast—bibliographical reference
Changing Tastes—California Historical Society article
The 'Only Competent Book' on Vegetables

Year of birth missing
Year of death missing
American chefs
American male chefs
American food writers
Writers from San Francisco
Cuisine of the San Francisco Bay Area
Chefs from San Francisco